Massimo Paganin (born 19 July 1970) is an Italian former professional footballer, who played as a defender; he was capable of playing both as a centre-back, as well as in the position of full-back.

Career
Paganin was born in Vicenza. Massimo's brother, Antonio Paganin, also played football professionally. The siblings played together for Internazionale, and won the 1993–94 UEFA Cup at the club. Throughout his career, Massimo Paganin played for many different clubs in addition to Inter, such as Fiorentina (the club with whom he began his youth career), Reggiana, Brescia, Bologna, Atalanta, Sampdoria, Vicenza, before ending his career in Greece with Akratitos. He also won the 1998 UEFA Intertoto Cup during his three seasons with Bologna (1997–2000), which allowed the club to qualify for the UEFA Cup.

Honours

Club
Inter
 UEFA Cup: 1993–94

Bologna
 UEFA Intertoto Cup: 1998

References

1970 births
Living people
Sportspeople from Vicenza
Association football defenders
Italian footballers
ACF Fiorentina players
A.C. Reggiana 1919 players
Brescia Calcio players
Inter Milan players
Bologna F.C. 1909 players
Atalanta B.C. players
U.C. Sampdoria players
L.R. Vicenza players
Serie A players
Serie B players
Italian expatriate footballers
Expatriate footballers in Greece
Italian expatriate sportspeople in Greece
A.P.O. Akratitos Ano Liosia players
Bassano Virtus 55 S.T. players
UEFA Cup winning players
Footballers from Veneto